Norbert "Norbi" Kiss (born 2 May 1985 in Szombathely) is a Hungarian truck race driver. He is a four-time FIA European Truck Racing Championship champion. He is one of the most successful Hungarians in motorsport.

Career 

He began racing with race car simulator, Live for Speed. The success he achieved in the simulator made people become aware of him. In 2005 Norbert Kiss raced for a short season in the Opel Astra Cup with four wins and was nominated Rookie of the Year. In 2006 he won the most prestigious brand cup in Hungary, the Renault Clio Cup at the first attempt. In the series he won ten times and only missed the rostrum once. At the end of that year he received the Rookie of the Year award. In 2007 he competed in the Hungarian SEAT León Cup, which started competition that year, for the IMC Motorsport and he became champion with Gábor Wéber finishing runner up. His success continued in 2008, even though he had to face serious competition from Wéber and Norbert Michelisz. At the end of the year he won the championship title again. The next year he raced in two categories, the Suzuki Swift Cup and the E category among the formula cars, with the Formula Renault. He won the Suzuki Cup (8 wins) and also landed top spot in the Formula Renault Group, he finished second in the absolute evaluation. In 2010 he featured the Zengő Motorsport in the Spanish SEAT León Supercopa for an incomplete season: 1 win, 2 second places and several good finishes throughout the year. He was third behind Carol and Nogues, but as his car was badly damaged in Jerez, he could not race at the final weekend and finished in sixth place. In 2014 and 2015 he became the champion in the FIA European Truck Racing Championship. 2021 he achieved his third European Champion title, in 2022 he won the championship with five races before the end of the season and thus defended his title for his fourth European Championship.

Over the years he never stopped pursuing virtual motorsports. He started racing in popular racing sim game iRacing and competed with a variety of Hungarian teams over the years, mainly in endurance races like the 24 hours of the Nürburgring. In 2021 he joined Team Racewerk.com, a German simracing team sponsored by a simracing hardware manufacturer and celebrated multiple wins and podium results in high rated endurance races, most notably the DNLS championship in the SP9 class, for which he partnered with Mercedes-AMG E-Sports Team HTR. In 2022 he joined getcloserracing Team, a team sponsored by a virtual motorsport business located in Dortmund, Germany. Norbi also functions as one of the brand ambassadors for getcloserracing and regularly competes in online endurance racing events with the team on iRacing.

Results

2005 

 Mobil 1 Opel Astra Cup, 4 wins, 5th place
 Rookie of the Year

2006 

 Shell V-Power Renault Clio Cup champion, 10 wins
 Speed Car Racer of the Year

2007 

 Hungarian SEAT León Supercup champion, eight wins
 Porsche Mobil 1 Supercup race, 16th place

2008 

 SEAT León Supercopa champion, 4 victories, 4 second places, 1 third place, 1 retirement

2009 

 Genex Suzuki Swift Cup champion, 8 wins, 1 third grid, 1, 1 retirement
 Single-seater Formula cars (E group) championship 2. place 
 Formula Renault Group champion

2010 

 Spanish SEAT León Supercopa 6. place

2011 

 FIA European Truck Racing Championship, 12th place with the #12 truck

2012 

 European Truck Racing Championship, 10th place with the #12 truck

2013 

 European Truck Racing Championship, 4th place with the #10 truck

2014 

 European Truck Racing Championship, 1st European Championship with the #4 truck

2015 

 European Truck Racing Championship, 2nd European Championship with the #1 truck, defending his title

2016 
 European Truck Racing Championship, 5th place with the #1 truck

2017 
 European Truck Racing Championship, 3rd place with #24 truck

2018 
 European Truck Racing Championship, 5th place with the #3 truck

2019 

 European Truck Racing Championship, 6th place with the #5 truck

2020 

 European Truck Racing Championship, 1st place with the #40 truck; the season was ended after only two events out of a planned 8, mainly due to COVID-19 restrictions. No title was awarded in 2020.

2021 

 European Truck Racing Championship, 3rd European Championship with the #41 truck

2022 

 European Truck Racing Championship, 4th European Championship with the #1 truck, defending his title 5 races before the end of the season

Full ETRC results

External links 

 Best moments 1
 One lap at the Hungaroring
 Best moments 2

References 

1985 births
Living people
Hungarian racing drivers
Sportspeople from Szombathely
FIA Motorsport Games drivers